The New Mexico Institute of Mining and Technology (New Mexico Tech or NMT), formerly New Mexico School of Mines, is a public university in Socorro, New Mexico. It offers over 30 bachelor of science degrees in technology, the sciences, engineering, management, and technical communication, as well as graduate degrees at the masters and doctoral levels.

History 
With 1,244 undergraduate students as of 2021, New Mexico Tech is a relatively small university focused on science and engineering. It was founded by the New Mexico Territorial Legislature in 1889 as the New Mexico School of Mines, with the goal of boosting the territorial economy by teaching mining specialties at the college level. 

During the 1930s, petroleum engineering and technology also became an important field of study at the institute. In 1946, New Mexico Tech began offering graduate degrees. The institute adopted its current name in 1951, but the change was not legally effective until 1960, through an amendment of the New Mexico State Constitution, Art. XII, Section 11.

Research and teaching

New Mexico Tech's well-known areas of research and teaching include hydrology, astrophysics, atmospheric physics, geophysics, information technology, information security, Earth Science, energetic materials engineering, and petroleum recovery.

In 2003, with funds from the U.S. Department of Homeland Security, New Mexico Tech purchased the town of Playas, New Mexico and the surrounding  to develop the Playas Training and Research Center, operated by the school's EMRTC, which provides training and research for the university's first responders, counterterrorism, and Air Force programs.

Rankings
According to the National Science Foundation, as of 2022, New Mexico Tech ranks 18th among the top 50 universities that produce Ph.D. students, sixth nationwide among all Physical Science and Earth Science universities, and first among all public universities for the percentage of bachelor’s students who later complete a Ph.D. In the 2022 college rankings for the western United States, U.S. News and World Report ranked New Mexico Tech the 18th best Regional University and fifth among public colleges.

Affiliated science and engineering centers
 New Mexico Bureau of Geology and Mineral Resources
 Energetic Materials Research and Testing Center
 Institute for Complex Additive Systems Analysis
 Incorporated Research Institutions for Seismology
 Langmuir Laboratory for Atmospheric Research
 Magdalena Ridge Observatory
 National Cave and Karst Research Institute
 National Radio Astronomy Observatory (an independent research organization operated by Associated Universities, Inc. located on the New Mexico Tech campus)
 Petroleum Recovery Research Center
 Playas Training and Research Center

Student life

NMT hosts an annual Performing Arts Series that is free to students, and, along with the broader Socorro community, city, and county, supports a great number of special events each year. New Mexico Tech is located approximately an hour south of Albuquerque in a region of high deserts to subalpine mountains that offers considerable outdoor recreation opportunities, including rock climbing, road and mountain biking, a triathlon, and hiking opportunities. New Mexico Tech also hosts numerous active student clubs, a Part 15 AM radio station, and a biweekly student newspaper, Paydirt. The campus includes an 18-hole championship golf course.

The campus population has historically been predominantly male, but it has moved increasingly towards a balance between the sexes. The gender distribution at New Mexico Tech  is 68% male and 32% female.

Popular culture
A number of television shows have focused on New Mexico Tech faculty, students, and research. TruTV's Man vs. Cartoon features attempts by Tech's Energetic Materials Research and Testing Center to re-create contraptions and situations found in Wile E. Coyote and the Road Runner cartoons. MythBusters, National Geographic Explorer, BBC Horizon and Nova have also featured Tech in various episodes. Another TV show featuring Tech's Energetic Materials Research and Testing Center, Blow Up U, began filming in the spring of 2009.

Notable alumni
Conrad Hilton (born 1887), American hotelier and the founder of the Hilton Hotels chain
Larry Soderblom (born 1944), American geophysicist with the Astrogeology Science center at the United States Geological Survey in Flagstaff, Arizona where he has served as Chief of the Branch of Astrogeology
Don Tripp (born 1946), American politician and a Republican member of the New Mexico House of Representatives representing District 49 since January 1999.
Fred Baker (born 1951), American engineer, specialized in developing computer network protocols for the Internet.
Ibrahim Mohammad Bahr al-Ulloum (born 1954), Iraqi Minister of Oil from May 2005 to December 2005, while he was a member of the Islamic Virtue Party.
Terry Wallace (born 1954), Director of Los Alamos National Laboratory
Lukas Lundin (born 1958), Swedish-Canadian billionaire businessman
Jeffrey A. Lockwood (born 1960) is an author, entomologist, and University of Wyoming professor of Natural Sciences and Humanities.
Axel Scherer, Professor, California Institute of Technology, inventor of the Vertical-Cavity Surface-Emitting Laser (VCSEL)
Jason Harper, is an American politician and a Republican member of the New Mexico House of Representatives representing District 57 since January 15, 2013.
Pauline Irene Nguene, Petroleum Engineer and Cameroon Minister of Social Affairs

References

External links

 Official website

 
Schools of mines in the United States
Technological universities in the United States
Public universities and colleges in New Mexico
Buildings and structures in Socorro County, New Mexico
Education in Socorro County, New Mexico
1889 establishments in New Mexico Territory
Educational institutions established in 1889
Summer Science Program
Socorro, New Mexico